Khemisti is a town and commune in Tipaza Province in northern Algeria.

References

Communes of Tipaza Province